Alone / But Never Alone  is an album by Larry Carlton, released in 1986.

Track listing 
All tracks by Larry Carlton except where noted

 "Smiles and Smiles to Go" – 5:47
 "Perfect Peace" – 4:28
 "Carrying You" – 4:00
 "The Lord's Prayer" (Albert Malotte) – 5:09
 "High Steppin'" – 5:44
 "Whatever Happens" (Larry Carlton, Bill Withers) – 4:27
 "Pure Delight" – 5:33
 "Alone/But Never Alone" – 3:37

Personnel 
 Larry Carlton – guitar, bass, keyboards, arrangements
 Terry Trotter – synthesizer, keyboards
 Abraham Laboriel – bass
 Rick Marotta – drums
 Michael Fisher – percussion

Chart performance

References

External links 
 Album at Last.fm

1986 albums
Larry Carlton albums
MCA Records albums